Calyptostoma expalpe is a species of mite in the genus Calyptostoma.

References 

Trombidiformes